Raw Melody Men was released in 1991 and is the first official live album release by British rock band New Model Army.

The album was recorded during the 1990 Impurity tour at the Brixton Academy, The Town & Country Club in London, the Berlin Eissporthalle and the Hamburg Sporthalle. The album was mixed at the Sawmills Studio in Cornwall.

On the album the track "A Liberal Education" has been abbreviated on "Lib Ed".

The title of the album, Raw Melody Men, is an anagram of "New Model Army". NMA did a short tour playing in small clubs "incognito" under this name prior to the big tour during which the live album was recorded.

Track listing
"Whirlwind" (Justin Sullivan, Robert Heaton)
"The Charge" (Sullivan, Heaton)
"Space" (Sullivan, Heaton, Nelson)
"Purity" (Sullivan)
"White Coats" (Sullivan, Heaton, Jason Harris)
"Vagabonds" (Sullivan)
"Get Me Out" (Sullivan, Heaton)
"Lib Ed" (Sullivan, Stuart Morrow)
"Better Than Them" (Sullivan)
"Innocence" (Sullivan, Heaton)
"Love Songs" (Sullivan, Heaton)
"Lurhstaap" (Sullivan, Heaton)
"Archway Towers" (Sullivan, Heaton)
"Smalltown England" (Sullivan, Morrow)
"Green and Grey" (Sullivan, Heaton)
"I Love the World" (Sullivan, Heaton)

Personnel

Production
John Cornfield – producer, mixed by
New Model Army – producer, mixed by

Musicians
Justin Sullivan – vocals, guitar
Robert Heaton – drums, vocals
Nelson – bass, keyboards, vocals
Ed Alleyne-Johnson – violin, keyboards, mandolin
Adrian Portas – guitar

References

Official NMA website
Discogs.com
John Relph's New Model Army discography

Albums produced by John Cornfield
New Model Army (band) live albums
1991 live albums
EMI Records live albums